Mission Santa María de los Ángeles was the last of the missions established by the Jesuits in Baja California, Mexico, in 1767. The mission was named after Saint Maria of the Angels.

History
The site chosen was the Cochimí settlement of Cabujakaamung ("arroyo of crags"), west of Bahía San Luis Gonzaga near the Gulf of California coast, about 22 kilometers east of Rancho Santa Inés, and south of Cataviña.

The mission site was visited by the Jesuit missionary-explorers Ferdinand Konščak and Wenceslaus Linck. Victoriano Arnés founded the mission to replace the unsatisfactory site of Calamajué only months before the Jesuits were expelled from Baja California.

After the establishment of Mission San Fernando Velicatá in 1769, Santa María was reduced to the status of a visita, or subordinate mission station. The visita was abandoned in 1818. Ruined structural walls and rock corrals survive at the site.

References
 Vernon, Edward W. 2002. Las Misiones Antiguas: Las Misiones Españolas de Baja California, 1683-1855. Viejo Press, Santa Barbara, California.

See also
 Spanish missions in California
 List of Jesuit sites

Santa Maria de los Angeles
Landmarks in Ensenada
1767 establishments in New Spain
Jesuit missions